Aleksandar Aleksić (born April 13, 1992) is a retired Serbian sprint canoer.

He won a bronze medal in the K4 1000 m event at the 2012 Canoe Sprint European Championships in Zagreb. For this result, he got a Serbian sports lifetime pension and an award for promoting Serbia internationally.

Biography
Aleksandar was born in Šabac, Serbia on 13 April 1992. He began canoeing in 2004 when he was 12.

The best results of his career so far are a bronze medal at the European Championship and 9th place in the Olympic Games in 2012. He was also fifth in the World Championship and achieved one win on the first stage of the World Cup 2013 held in Szeged.

When he was in junior category, his best result was 4th place at European championships in 2009.

Aleksandar was a Red Bull sponsored athlete from 2013 to the end of his career at the end of 2014.

He is currently retired from competition.

References

External links
 
 
 
 

1992 births
Living people
Serbian male canoeists
Sportspeople from Šabac
Olympic canoeists of Serbia
Canoeists at the 2012 Summer Olympics
21st-century Serbian people